Anthony David Williams (1799-1860) was a Liberian politician who served as the second vice president of Liberia from 1850 to 1854 under President Joseph Jenkins Roberts. Born free in the United States in 1799, he immigrated as a Methodist preacher from Petersburg, Virginia to Liberia in 1823. Williams served as the Colonial Agent for the American Colonization Society from 1837 to 1839. During his tenure, the colony of Mississippi-in-Africa was established. In the 1849 elections, Williams ran for vice president against incumbent Nathaniel Brander. The failure of any candidate to secure a majority of the vote led the race to be thrown to the House of Representatives, which chose Williams as vice president. He died in 1860.

His son, Anthony D. Williams, Jr., served as Secretary of War and Navy, and later unsuccessfully ran for president in 1891 and 1893 as the candidate for the New Republican Party and again in 1899 as the candidate of the National Union Party.

References

Vice presidents of Liberia
1799 births
1860 deaths
Americo-Liberian people
19th-century Liberian politicians
19th-century African-American people